Aleksandr Sergeyevich Nesterov (born 24 March 2000) is a Russian football player.

Club career
Nesterov made his debut in the Russian Football National League for FC Akron Tolyatti on 10 July 2021 in a game against FC SKA-Khabarovsk.

On 27 December 2022, Nesterov terminated his contract with Noah by mutual consent.

References

External links
 
 Profile by Russian Football National League

2000 births
Sportspeople from Samara, Russia
Living people
Russian footballers
Association football defenders
FC Orenburg players
FC Akron Tolyatti players
FC Dynamo Stavropol players
FC Noah players
Russian First League players
Russian Second League players
Armenian Premier League players
Russian expatriate footballers
Expatriate footballers in Armenia
Russian expatriate sportspeople in Armenia